Ed McNamara (21 June 1921 – 11 October 1986) was a Canadian film actor. He appeared in more than forty films from 1941 to 1986.

At the 27th Canadian Film Awards in 1976, McNamara and his costar Hugh Webster jointly won the Canadian Film Award for Best Actor in a Non-Feature for their performances in For Gentlemen Only, and McNamara received a Genie Award nomination for Best Actor at the 7th Genie Awards in 1986, for his performance in Bayo. In the same year, he received the Academy of Canadian Cinema and Television's Earle Grey Award for lifetime achievement.

Selected filmography

References

External links
 

1921 births
1986 deaths
Canadian male film actors
Canadian male television actors
Canadian male voice actors
20th-century Canadian male actors
Male actors from Toronto